"The Stars That Blink" is a short story by Orson Scott Card.  It only appears in his short story collection Capitol.

Plot summary
This story takes place on a planet called Answer.  Although it is still a colony world it is almost ready to enter the empire as a full member and become eligible to receive the fictional drug Somec.  The governor of Answer is looking up at the stars and thinking how this will bring an end to the peaceful life they lead when a starship arrives in orbit.  When the captain of the ship lands on the planet he tells the governor that there has been a revolution and that almost all of the people on the planet Capitol are dead.  He goes on to tell the governor that the revolution has spread to other planets and that the people are destroying Somec all over the empire.  When the captain says that he has a supply of Somec and the necessary equipment to put people into suspended animation on board the ship, the governor asks to see them.  Once on the ship the governor destroys the equipment to record people brains making the Somec useless.  He then offers to let the crew of the ship live on the planet and they accept.

Connection to the Worthing Saga
This book uses several plot elements also used in The Worthing Saga, such as the sleeping drug Somec and the taping of memories.  The fact that Abner Doon destroyed the planet Capitol is mentioned several times in Card's novel The Worthing Chronicle.

See also

List of works by Orson Scott Card
Orson Scott Card

External links
 The official Orson Scott Card website

1978 short stories
Short stories by Orson Scott Card